The Mayor of Warrington is the highest-ranking officer in the municipal government of Warrington, England.

Role
The Mayor of Warrington, as the first person of the borough, chairs meetings of Warrington Borough Council. Elected for one year, the mayor also is a representative of the town who is responsible for officially welcoming people and inviting people to the town. The mayor officially hosts civic events of the town. In this role and the mayor promotes the town of Warrington to attract more investment and visitors to the area.

History
The first mayor of Warrington was William Beamont. He became mayor following the incorporation of the borough in 1847. At that time, 27 councillors from the then much smaller borough were appointed to the small town hall in the centre of modern Warrington. As the town increased in size, the council was moved to Bank Hall, the former home of Lord Winmarleigh for £9,700. This is still the town hall and its "golden gates" are one of the town's attractions.

References

Local government in Warrington

Warrington